Den Haag Ypenburg is a railway station in the Leidschenveen-Ypenburg district of The Hague, Netherlands. It opened on 11 December 2005. It is situated on the Gouda–Den Haag railway.

Train services
The following train services currently call at Den Haag Ypenburg:
2x per hour local service (sprinter) The Hague - Gouda - Utrecht
2x per hour local service (stoptrein) The Hague - Gouda Goverwelle

Gallery

External links
NS website 
Dutch Public Transport journey planner 

Ypenburg
Railway stations opened in 2005